Season two of the reality show I Survived a Japanese Game Show premiered on ABC on June 17, 2009, and was the final run of the series. Like season one, it follows a group of Americans who leave the United States for Japan, where they compete in a Japanese style game show.

The number of episodes were increased from seven to eight for this season. Other significant changes from season one was that Tony Sano, who hosted the first season, did not return to host the second season, and the number of players was increased from ten to twelve. Also, while season one had only one group game before the elimination game, season two added a second group game, with the winning team from the first game gaining an advantage in the second game. Otherwise, the format remained the same from season one.

Originally, ten episodes were being produced, but due to the return of Who Wants to Be a Millionaire on primetime, the show was reduced to eight. At the end of Episode 7, there is a scene that features clowns and liquor but was never aired in time for the season finale. In the season finale that aired on August 5, Cathy Grosam, a 36-year-old "soccer mom" from Bartlett, Illinois, was declared the winner. Grosam also was a member on the winning team in every team game and thus participated in every reward event during the season. She won a cash prize of US$250,000.

Contestants
 Order of appearance in the opening credits: Brent, Cathy, Bobaloo, Yari, Dan, Debbie, Drew, Jamie, Justin, Kimberly, Linda and Megan.

List of episodes
<onlyinclude>

Game results

 The contestant was a member of the Green Tigers.
 The contestant was a member of the Red Robots.
 The contestant was a finalist and competed as an individual.
 (OMEDETO) The contestant was the winner.
 (SAYONARA) The contestant was the runner-up.
 (WIN) The contestant was on the winning team and was immune from the Elimination challenge.
 (LOSE) The contestant was on the losing team, but was not selected for the Elimination challenge.
 (LOSE) The contestant was on the losing team and selected for the Elimination challenge, and won.
 (SAYONARA) The contestant lost the Elimination Challenge and was eliminated.
 (SAYONARA) The contestant finished last in an individual challenge and was eliminated.

Ratings 

t – Tied.

 Show was aired at 10 pm ET due to President Obama press conference that night.

The show faced three other reality contests: America's Got Talent on NBC, So You Think You Can Dance? on Fox, Hitched or Ditched on The CW through July 8 when repeats of America's Next Top Model replaced it and reruns of Criminal Minds on CBS. In the first week, it faced Law and Order on NBC; the reason the season started earlier (as opposed to the original July 8 date) was the date and time change of Mike Judge's The Goode Family to Fridays at 8:30 pm ET/PT due to lower than expected ratings on Wednesdays. On July 22, it ran against a repeat episode of CSI: NY on CBS and The Philanthropist on NBC.

See also
 Main article
 Season 1 of ISaJGS

References

2009 American television seasons